The iron mines of Tele-Nugar are located approximately 155 km south of the regional center of Melfi, in  Barhr Signaka Department, Guera Region, Chad.

Site description 
Discovered in 1911, the iron mines comprise an area roughly 1000 m in diameter.  The Fanian people who utilized the site extracted iron and reduced it into a final product.  Several holes can be found dispersed throughout the site, allowing sufficient ventilation and illumination for the miners working below.  Pillars help support a main arch in the mine, which were sculpted directly into the walls.

Archaeology 
Archaeological specimens found at the site include stove walls used for iron reduction, blast pipe fragments, pottery shards, and slag heaps.

Other site uses 
In addition to being used as a source of iron and processing location, the mine was also used as defensive shelter for the Fanians during raids from the Ouaddai Kingdom.

World Heritage status 
This site was added to the UNESCO World Heritage Tentative List on July 21, 2005 in the Cultural category.

References 

1911 establishments in Chad
Mines in Chad
Iron mines
World Heritage Tentative List